My Brother & Me is the first remix album by American rap duo Ying Yang Twins from Atlanta, Georgia. The album reached #12 on the U.S. charts and #68 on the UK Albums Chart. The album mainly consists of remixes of former hits by both Ying Yang Twins and other rappers.

Track listing 
 "Halftime (Stand Up & Get Crunk!)" (featuring Homebwoi) - 4:31
 "Slow Motion [Remix]" (featuring Juvenile, Wyclef Jean, Skip, & Wacko) - 4:09
 "Take Ya Clothes Off" (featuring Bone Crusher) - 3:51
 "Do It" (featuring Da Muzicianz & Nue Breed) - 4:33
 "In Da Club" (featuring Yonnie) - 4:17
 "Me & My Brother [Remix]" (featuring YoungBloodZ) - 4:01
 "Get Crunk Shorty" (Nick Cannon featuring Ying Yang Twins & Fatman Scoop) - 4:11
 "Georgia Dome [Remix]" (featuring Jacki-O & Fatman Scoop) - 4:52
 "Salt Shaker [Remix]" (featuring Lil Jon, Fat Joe, Juvenile, Fatman Scoop & Murphy Lee) - 4:48
 "Salt Shaker [Extended Remix]" (featuring Lil Jon, Murphy Lee, Fat Joe,, Jacki-O, Fatman Scoop, Juvenile, B.G. & Pitbull) - 8:23
 "What's Happnin!" [multimedia track]
 "Salt Shaker" [multimedia track]
 "Naggin'" [multimedia track]
 "Performance from the 2004 BET Awards" [multimedia track]
 "Performance from the WB Presents Pepsi Smash" [multimedia track]
 "MTV Cribs appearance" [DVD]

References

Ying Yang Twins albums
Albums produced by Just Blaze
Albums produced by Mr. Collipark
2004 remix albums
TVT Records compilation albums
TVT Records remix albums